Football Club Juventus des Cayes (commonly referred to as Juventus des Cayes) is a professional football club based in Les Cayes, Haiti.

References

Football clubs in Haiti
Association football clubs established in 2006
2006 establishments in Haiti
Sud (department)